Martial Outlaw is a 1993 action/martial arts film written by Thomas Ritz, produced by Pierre David, directed by Kurt Anderson and stars Jeff Wincott, Gary Hudson and Richard Jaeckel in his final film appearance before his death in June 1997.

Plot 
DEA agent Kevin White has followed the movements of drug-dealing ex-KGB kingpin Nikolai Rodchenko (Vladimir Skomarovsky) from Moscow to San Francisco, then to Los Angeles, where Kevin crosses paths with his older brother Jack, a maverick LAPD cop who attempts to become involved in the operation, placing both brothers' lives at risk from a group of dangerous Soviet martial arts experts.

Cast 
Jeff Wincott as DEA Agent Kevin White
Gary Hudson as Sgt. Jack White
Vladimir Skomarovsky as Nikolai Rodchenko
Krista Errickson as Lori White
Richard Jaeckel as Mr. White
Stefanos Miltsakakis as Sergei
Natasha Pavlovich as Mia Antonova
Liliana Komorowska as Marina 
Gary Wood as Lt. Evans
Anna Karin as Waitress
Ari Barak as Andrei Antonov
Christopher Kriesa as Hal
Richard Kwong as Shop Owner
Will Leong as Stick Fighter
Ed Moore as Commander Burke
Thomas Ritz as Grunsky
Christopher Ursitti as San Francisco Agent
Edi Wilde as Ivan

References

External links 
 
 
 

1993 action films
1993 films
Films set in Los Angeles
1993 martial arts films
1990s English-language films
Films directed by Kurt Anderson
Films scored by Louis Febre
American martial arts films
1990s American films